SAMPLE history is a mnemonic acronym to remember key questions for a person's medical assessment. The SAMPLE history is sometimes used in conjunction with vital signs and OPQRST. The questions are most commonly used in the field of emergency medicine by first responders during the secondary assessment. It is used for alert people, but often much of this information can also be obtained from the family or friend of an unresponsive person. In the case of severe trauma, this portion of the assessment is less important. A derivative of SAMPLE history is AMPLE history which places a greater emphasis on a person's medical history.

Meaning
The parts of the mnemonic are:

S – Signs/Symptoms (Symptoms are important but they are subjective.) 
A – Allergies
M – Medications
P – Past Pertinent medical history 
L – Last Oral Intake (Sometimes also Last Menstrual Cycle.) 
E – Events Leading Up To Present Illness / Injury

See also
OPQRST
DCAP-BTLS
ABC (medicine)
Past Medical History

References

External links

Emergency medical services
First aid
Medical mnemonics
Mnemonic acronyms